Dionisis Angelopoulos (born 5 August 1992) is a Greek rower. He competed at the 2016 Summer Olympics in the men's coxless four. The Greek team finished in 8th place.

References 

1992 births
Living people
Greek male rowers
Rowers at the 2016 Summer Olympics
Olympic rowers of Greece
Mediterranean Games silver medalists for Greece
Mediterranean Games medalists in rowing
Competitors at the 2013 Mediterranean Games